Charles Hederer (2 August 1886 – 24 September 1967) was the inventor of the 'pulmoventilateur' a mechanical device used for artificial respiration.

References

People from Vesoul
1886 births
1967 deaths
French military doctors
20th-century French inventors